Shipman may refer to:

People
Abraham Shipman (died 1664), English governor of Bombay
Alan Shipman (1901–1979), English cricketer
Barry Shipman (1912-1994), American screenwriter
Bill Shipman (1886–1943), English cricketer
Claire Shipman, American television correspondent
David Shipman (colonist) (1730–1813), American colonist
David Shipman (writer) (1932–1996), British film critic and writer
Dee Shipman, songwriter
Ellen Biddle Shipman (1869–1950), American landscape architect
Ernest Shipman (1871-1931), Canadian producer
Ernest Shipman (pilot), World War II Air Force pilot Ace
Evan Biddle Shipman, horse-racing columnist for the New York Morning Telegraph; see Evan Shipman Handicap
Gary Shipman (born 1966), American comic book artist, husband of Rhoda Shipman
Gwynne Shipman, 1909-2005), American actress
Harold Shipman (1946–2004), British physician and serial killer
Herbert Shipman (1869–1930), American Episcopalian bishop
Helen Shipman (1899–1984), American actress
Jamar Shipman (born 1985), American professional wrestler better known as Jay Lethal
John Greenwood Shipman (1848–1918), English barrister and politician
Madisyn Shipman (born 2002), American actress
Mark Shipman (born 1973), British diver
Matt Shipman, American voice actor
Megan Shipman, American voice actress
Nathaniel Shipman (1828–1906), United States federal judge
Nell Shipman (1892–1970), Canadian actress
Nina Shipman, (born 1930), American actress
Rhoda Shipman (born 1968), American comic book writer, wife of Gary Shipman
Vera Brady Shipman (1889–1932), American composer, journalist, and writer
William Shipman (Medal of Honor) (1831–1894), American sailor
William Davis Shipman (1818-1898), United States federal judge
William Herbert Shipman (1854–1943), businessman on island of Hawaii

Places
Shipman, Illinois, United States
Shipman Township, Macoupin County, Illinois, United States
Shipman, Virginia, United States
Shipman, Saskatchewan, Canada
Shipman Knotts, a fell in the Lake District of England
W.H. Shipman House, a historic house in Hilo, Hawaii

Other uses
Shipman (television film), a television drama about the crimes of Harold Shipman

he:שיפמן